Skoger is a village located on the border between Buskerud and Vestfold counties, Norway. Of its population  of 1,082 as of 2005, 654 were registered as residents of Drammen whereas 428 live in Sande in Vestfold county, Norway.

History
Historically the area had large forested areas, and much arable land. Reference to Skoger is made in the land register maintained by Bishop  Eystein Erlendsson (Biskop Eysteins jordebok). The parish of Skouger was established as a municipality January 1, 1838 under of the law of formannskapsdistrikt.   This provision of the Constitution of Norway, required that every parish (Norwegian: prestegjeld) form a local self-government district.  Skoger with 1,837 inhabitants merged with Strømsgodset with 731 inhabitants, as well as an uninhabited part of Eiker on January 1, 1844. The enlarged Skoger municipality had a population of 2,568. Until 1889 the name was written Skouger.

A part of Skoger was moved to Drammen on 1 January 1870. The rest of Skoger was incorporated into Drammen on 1 January 1964. This entailed a border adjustment by which Skoger became a part of Buskerud county.

Skoger Parish
Skoger has two parish churches both of which are part of the Church of Norway and belongs to Drammen deanery in Tunsberg diocese. Access to both sites is via Norwegian National Road 33 ( FV33). Skoger Church (Skoger kirke) was inaugurated on 9 December 1885. It is built of brick stone and has 300 seats. 
Skoger Old Church (Skoger gamle kirke) has an estimated date of origin of between 1200 and 1220 and is one of Drammen's oldest buildings.

Etymology 
The Old Norse form of the name was Skógar. The name is the plural form of skóg meaning 'woodland, forest'.

Notable residents

References

Other sources
Haugen, Einar (1974) Norwegian-English Dictionary: A Pronouncing and Translating Dictionary of Modern Norwegian (University of Wisconsin Press) 

Villages in Buskerud
Former municipalities of Norway
Drammen